Plant Early is the fifth solo album by dobro player Jerry Douglas, released in 1989 (see 1989 in music). It was his last release on the MCA label. It is out of print.

Track listing

1989 albums
Jerry Douglas albums
MCA Records albums